Southern Norway Regional Health Authority was a regional health authority that covered the counties of Aust-Agder, Buskerud, Telemark, Vest-Agder and Vestfold in Norway, as well as the national hospitals in Oslo. The authority was founded on January 1, 2002, but merged with the Eastern Norway Regional Health Authority to form the new Southern and Eastern Norway Regional Health Authority on June 1, 2007.

The eight health trusts owned by the authority were Blefjell Health Trust, Rikshospitalet–Radiumhospitalet, Vestfold Psychiatric Health Trust, Ringerike Heath Trust, Buskerud Health Trust, Vestfold Health Trust, Telemark Health Trust and Sørlandet Health Trust. It also owned by of Southern and Eastern Norway Pharmaceutical Trust.

Defunct government agencies of Norway
Defunct health trusts of Norway
Companies based in Skien
Norwegian companies established in 2002